Devin Wilson (born October 13, 1990) is an indoor football wide receiver who is currently a free agent. He previously attended Tennessee State University where he played college football for the Tennessee State Tigers and studied human performance and sports science.

Early career 

Wilson played high school football at the Pope John Paul II High School. He was named to the All-Region team in his junior and senior year. He also played track and field and received All-Region honors in that sport as well. Wilson committed to attend Tennessee State and started in one game in 2009. After playing in four games in 2010, Wilson was injured in practice after being tackled on September 28, 2010, paralyzing him. His doctors diagnosed him with a spinal shock injury, but he recovered fully in time for the 2011 season. From 2009 to 2013, Wilson started in 43 games and caught 102 passes for 1,200 yards and six touchdowns.

Professional career 

Wilson played for the Richmond Raiders of the Professional Indoor Football League in five games during the 2015 season. He recorded 40 catches for 483 yards and eight touchdowns.

In May 2015, Wilson was signed by the Saskatchewan Roughriders of the Canadian Football League. He spent the first six weeks of the regular season on the practice squad. On August 8, Wilson made his CFL debut against the Toronto Argonauts, recording two receptions for 15 yards and a special-teams tackle. He scored his first touchdown on a 25-yard pass in the August 22 game against the Calgary Stampeders.

On November 11, 2015, Wilson was assigned to the Cleveland Gladiators of the Arena Football League. He was placed on reassignment on April 1, 2017.

On May 23, 2017, Wilson signed with the Jacksonville Sharks.

On July 20, 2017, Wilson was assigned to the Gladiators.

In a 2022 game between the Jacksonville Sharks and the San Antonio Gunslingers, Sharks player Devin Wilson hit official Gary Vaught from behind. Wilson was suspended indefinitely.

References 

1990 births
Living people
American players of Canadian football
American football wide receivers
Canadian football wide receivers
Tennessee State Tigers football players
Richmond Raiders players
Saskatchewan Roughriders players
Cleveland Gladiators players
Jacksonville Sharks players
Maine Mammoths players
Players of American football from Nashville, Tennessee
Sportspeople from Nashville, Tennessee